Predjama is a small settlement in the Municipality of Postojna in the Inner Carniola region of Slovenia.

Landmarks

Castle

Predjama Castle, a Renaissance castle and  a major tourist attraction in Slovenia, is located at the mouth of a cave just above the settlement.

Church

Our Lady of Sorrows Church in the settlement is a chapel of ease of the Parish of Studeno. It is a single-nave Gothic church painted with frescos from  1460 that was built at the end of the 15th century. It has been protected as a cultural monument of national significance.

References

External links

Predjama on Geopedia

Populated places in the Municipality of Postojna

it:Castel Lueghi